Praskovya Ivanovskaya (3 November 1852 – 19 September 1935) was a Russian revolutionary, was a member of both the Narodnaya Volya (People's Will) and Socialist-Revolutionary Party.

Early life
Praskovya was born in Sokovnino, Tula Governorate on 3 November 1852. She was the daughter of a priest, and her mother died when she was young, leaving her to be educated at the local boarding school. Ivanovskaya's older brother, Vasily Ivanovsky, was a medical student who had become a follower of Sergey Nechayev. It was through her brother that Praskovya became interested in revolutionary activity, and was able to acquire radical literature which she distributed at her school. This resulted in her arrest, though she was released without charge.

Revolutionary life
After finishing her studies, Praskovya moved to Odessa where she immediately made contact with other radicals living in the city. She worked distributing socialist propaganda to factory workers by day while providing literacy lessons in the evening.

In the summer of 1876, Ivanovskaya found work as a farm labourer in Ukraine, with intentions to spreading information on the Zemlya i volya (Land and liberty) movement. However, this did not quite work out as she had hoped, for she was so exhausted by the end of the day's work that she had little energy for propaganda work.

After the split of "Zemlya i volya", she became a member of the more radical break away faction, Narodnaya Volya (the Peoples Will), which favoured a policy of terrorism.

She was then briefly imprisoned, and after her release lived in an émigré colony of Russian radicals in Romania.

Later in 1880, Ivanovskaya returned to Russia where she worked in an underground printing plant producing propaganda for Narodnaya Volya, one job having been to print leaflets explaining why they had assassinated Emperor Alexander II of Russia.

Following the assassination of Alexander II, several members of Narodnaya Volya were arrested and on 3 April 1881, and many were subsequently hanged.

Ivanovskaya was arrested and charged with involvement in the assassination. She was sentenced to death, with the sentence being reduced to life, hard labour.

After fifteen years she was released from prison, but was sent to Siberia. In 1903, she escaped and went into hiding, joining the Socialist Revolutionary Party and became involved with the SR Combat Organisation. In 1904, she helped the organisation in the assassination of the Minister of Interior, Vyacheslav Plehve.

Ivanovskaya became one of many revolutionaries to be betrayed by Evno Azef, which led to her arrest and imprisonment, however was granted amnesty as part of Nicholas II concessions following the 1905 revolution.

In 1925, Ivanovskaya published her autobiography.

References

1852 births
1935 deaths
People from Tula Oblast
People from Tula Governorate
Narodnaya Volya
Socialist Revolutionary Party politicians
Russian memoirists
Russian women writers
Russian revolutionaries
Women memoirists
Female revolutionaries